Fahad Al-Yami (born April 7, 1992) is a Saudi football player who plays as a defender.

References

External links 
 

1992 births
Living people
Saudi Arabian footballers
Al Nassr FC players
Al-Kawkab FC players
Al-Fayha FC players
Al-Sharq Club players
Al-Sadd FC (Saudi football club) players
Saudi First Division League players
Saudi Professional League players
Saudi Second Division players
Association football defenders